Uncanny Tales was an American weird menace pulp magazine that ran from April 1939 to May 1940.  Published by Martin Goodman under the "Manvis Publications, Inc." imprint. It should not be confused with Goodman's "shudder" publication Uncanny Stories.

The magazine was based in Chicago.

See also
 List of defunct American periodicals

References

Magazines established in 1939
Magazines disestablished in 1940
Pulp magazines
Magazines published in Chicago